Gallagher Ridge is a Canadian community, located in Westmorland County, New Brunswick. The community is situated in southeastern New Brunswick, to the northwest of Moncton. Gallagher Ridge is part of Greater Moncton. Gallagher Ridge is located on New Brunswick Route 126.

History

Notable people

See also
List of communities in New Brunswick

References

Bordering communities

Indian Mountain, New Brunswick
Canaan Station, New Brunswick
New Scotland, New Brunswick
Moncton, New Brunswick

Communities in Westmorland County, New Brunswick
Communities in Greater Moncton